is a Japanese manga magazine, which was published quarterly by Million Publishing from October 25, 2010 to May 25, 2013, for 11 issues; for its final issue, it was rebranded . The manga in the magazine focus on male characters who cross-dress; the magazine also includes articles, interviews, and media reviews.

The Oto Nyan manga include both one-shots and series, and often have themes of gay male romance and eroticism; long-running series in the magazine include Ei Tachibana's You See, Teacher... and Hinaki's Amahara-kun+. A sister publication, was released from July 11, 2011 to April 15, 2013, and features cross-dressing manga on a given theme varying with each issue. Oto Nyan was well received and mainly competed with Ichijinsha's cross-dressing manga magazine Waai!.

History
Oto Nyan was announced August 2010, and publisher Million Publishing launched its first issue on October 25, 2010, following behind Ichijinsha's similar magazine Waai!, which launched earlier that year. Issues of the magazine often came bundled with feminine clothing items intended for male readers to wear, which an Oto Nyan spokeswoman described as something to make the otokonoko fantasy more real for readers, and with items chosen based on what characters in the Oto Nyan manga often wear; these included knee socks, a hair pin, a swimsuit, a lingerie set, and a plaid miniskirt.

The magazine was released quarterly, and was initially 207 pages long; with volume 8, the magazine was expanded by over a hundred pages, to 323, and added several new serialized manga, along with a redesign and slight price reduction. A sister publication, Otokonoko Comic Anthology, was published from July 11, 2011 to April 15, 2013, with each issue featuring manga one-shots on a given theme; for example, volume 1 features stories that are all about male characters cross-dressing because they are forced to by others. The Oto Nyan book Josō Shōnen Game Taizen 2009–2011 was released on August 29, 2011, and features reviews and coverage of video games from 2009–2011 that feature otokonoko characters.

For the main magazine's eleventh issue, it was rebranded Oto Nyan Omega, but put on hiatus after its release on May 25, 2013; the editorial department wrote that they were hoping to be able to bring Oto Nyan back in some form in the future, and asked readers to follow the magazine's website and social media for updates. Several of the manga published in Oto Nyan and Otokonoko Comic Anthology were later re-released in collected tankōbon volumes; some of these have in turn been published in English.

Content
Oto Nyan published manga one-shots and series about cross-dressing male characters and otokonoko, often with themes of gay male romance and eroticism. In addition to the manga, the magazine includes feature articles, interviews, reviews of anime, video games, and novels with cross-dressing male characters, and illustration galleries. Some issues include audio drama CDs, including a two-volume drama where characters voiced by Rino Kawashima and Hikaru Isshiki hypnotize a male point-of-view character to make him wear women's clothes.

Manga

Series

One-shots

Reception

Natalie found it exciting to see Oto Nyan launch and how it broadened the otokonoko scene. They described it as a magazine that constantly drew the spotlight due to the unusual items bundled with the issues, fighting for attention with the major competing cross-dressing manga magazine Waai!, which bundled cosmetics products with its issues. Pop culture news site Akiba Blog appreciated Oto Nyan slightly bigger focus on eroticism compared to Waai! and found that it made the magazine stand out. Reviewing My Cute Crossdresser, a collection of several of Mitohi Matsumoto's manga from the magazine, Bleeding Cool recommended them to readers who like "bulges, a little bondage, and dudes kissing other dudes when they're dressed up as girls", finding Leo and the Night Sky of Summer the most interesting.

Notes

References

External links
  

2010 establishments in Japan
2011 establishments in Japan
2013 disestablishments in Japan
Cross-dressing in anime and manga
Defunct magazines published in Japan
LGBT in anime and manga
Magazines disestablished in 2013
Magazines established in 2010
Magazines established in 2011
Quarterly manga magazines published in Japan
Men's magazines published in Japan
Seinen manga magazines